These hits topped the Ultratop 50 in the Flemish region of Belgium in 1992.

See also
1992 in music

References

1992 in Belgium
1992 record charts
1992